T71 may refer to:

Military

T71 Light Tank, a proposed replacement for the M41 Walker Bulldog
90 mm Gun Motor Carriage T71, the prototype variant of the M36 tank destroyer "Jackson", equipping a 90 mm gun turret on a 3-inch Gun Motor Carriage M10A1 hull, with its turret redesigned and standardized as "M36"

Other

T71 Dudelange, a basketball club